Winnie the Pooh is a media franchise produced by The Walt Disney Company, based on A. A. Milne and E. H. Shepard's stories featuring Winnie-the-Pooh. It started in 1966 with the theatrical release of the short Winnie the Pooh and the Honey Tree.

The tone, action, and plot of the franchise is made much softer and slower than that of any other Disney animated film, in order to appeal to a more preschool-oriented audience.

History
As early as 1938, Walt Disney expressed interest in obtaining the film rights to the Pooh books by first corresponding with the literary agency Curtis Brown. In June 1961, Disney Productions acquired the film rights. By 1964, Disney told his animation staff that he was planning to make a full-length animated feature film based on the books. A meeting was held with senior staff members to discuss the proposed film. However, during the meeting, Disney decided not to make a feature film, but instead a featurette that could be attached to a live-action film. Disney dropped the hyphens from the name. Disney also secured the American and Canadian merchandising rights from Stephen Slesinger's widow and adopted Slesinger's red-shirted version of Pooh. To Milne's set of characters, Disney added Gopher to add a more traditional and relatable American creature to the mix. Winnie the Pooh and the Honey Tree in 1966 was the franchise's big-screen debut.

In the midst of a 2003 battle where Disney stood to lose commercial rights to Winnie the Pooh, The Age noted "Losing control of the Winnie the Pooh franchise would be a disaster for Disney. Analysts believe Pooh is worth $3bn-$6bn of Disney's total annual sales of $25bn." According to a 2013 Variety article, Winnie the Pooh is the third best-selling franchise in the world, after Disney's own Disney Princess and Star Wars. The New York Times said "The stakes are high for Disney. Global sales of Pooh merchandise — books, plush toys, T-shirts, potty chairs — have fallen 12% over the last five years, but still account for a staggering $5.5 billion", adding "Pooh...remains Disney’s second best-selling character after Mickey Mouse". It noted "Branding experts say aging character franchises are among the most difficult to keep alive because they require continually walking a tightrope. 'With Winnie the Pooh, Disney is going to continue to struggle with the tension of remaining relevant to kids versus maintaining a love-mark brand that parents trust,' said Matt Britton, a founder of Mr. Youth, a New York marketing firm." In a 2014 overview of Disney's top franchises, CNN wrote "Pooh may have been born in the 1920s in A.A. Milne's books. But the bear is still going strong via Disney movies and DVD's. Pooh Bear sells games, stuffed animals, clothing, and even iPhone and iPad apps. Pooh is also a favorite subject in books from Disney Publishing Worldwide, the world's largest publisher of children's books and magazines with more than 700 million products sold each year".

Films

Feature films

Animated films

The Many Adventures of Winnie the Pooh (1977)
The Many Adventures of Winnie the Pooh is a 1977 American animated musical comedy film produced by Walt Disney Productions and distributed by Buena Vista Distribution. It is the 22nd Disney animated feature film and was first released on March 11, 1977. The film consists of three previously released shorts that have been edited together. The ending scene is based on the final chapter of A. A. Milne's The House at Pooh Corner.

Sebastian Cabot narrates the adventures of joyous bear Winnie the Pooh as he seeks out and deals with complications from his search for honey, weathers a terrible wind storm and subsequent flood, endures the foibles of the hyperactive tiger Tigger, and celebrates Eeyore's birthday. Winnie the Pooh, Piglet, Eeyore, Kanga, Roo, and Tigger round out the menagerie in a 1977 American comedy film.

Sterling Holloway voices the Pooh character.

Winnie the Pooh (2011)
Winnie the Pooh is a 2011 American animated musical comedy film produced by Walt Disney Animation Studios and released by Walt Disney Pictures. It is the 51st Disney animated feature film. Inspired by A. A. Milne's stories of the same name, the film is part of Disney's Winnie the Pooh franchise, the fifth theatrical Winnie the Pooh film released, and Walt Disney Animation Studios' second adaptation of Winnie-the-Pooh stories.

Upon learning that Eeyore has lost his tail, the residents of the Hundred Acre Wood start a contest to see who can find a new one for the melancholy donkey — with a pot of honey going to the winner. Amid the goings-on, Owl mistakenly relates the news that Christopher Robin has been abducted by a monster called The Backson.

The Tigger Movie (2000)
The Tigger Movie is a 2000 American animated musical comedy drama film co-written and directed by Jun Falkenstein. Part of the Winnie-the-Pooh series, this film features the rambunctious tiger Tigger in his search for his family tree and other Tiggers like himself. The film was the first feature-length theatrical Pooh film to not be a collection of previously released shorts.

Winnie the Pooh, Piglet, Owl, Kanga, Roo, and Rabbit are preparing a suitable winter home for Eeyore, the perennially dejected donkey, but Tigger's continual bouncing interrupts their efforts. Rabbit suggests Tigger go find others of his kind to bounce with, but Tigger thinks "the most wonderful thing about tiggers is" he's "the only one!" Just in case though, the joyous tiger sets out to see if he can find relatives.

Piglet's Big Movie (2003)
Piglet's Big Movie is a 2003 American animated musical adventure comedy-drama film produced by Disneytoon Studios, and released by Walt Disney Pictures on March 21, 2003. It is based upon the characters in the Winnie-the-Pooh books written by A. A. Milne. It is the second in the series of theatrically released Winnie the Pooh films which were not produced by Walt Disney Feature Animation, preceded by The Tigger Movie (2000) and followed by Pooh's Heffalump Movie (2005). The film features songs by Carly Simon.

Piglet becomes fed up after being excluded from a honey-thieving scheme, so strikes out on his own to do some thinking. But when the inhabitants in the Hundred Acre Wood discover he's missing, the only clue they have to go on is a scrapbook he left behind.

Pooh's Heffalump Movie (2005)
Pooh's Heffalump Movie is a 2005 American animated musical comedy film produced by Disneytoon Studios and released by Walt Disney Pictures, featuring characters from A. A. Milne's classic stories. This film features songs by Carly Simon.

Winnie the Pooh, Piglet, Tigger and Roo search for a mysterious and fearsome creature that has entered the Hundred Acre Wood, but Roo discovers that the creature is not what it seems.

Live-action/animated film

Christopher Robin (2018)

A live-action movie and continuation based on A. A. Milne's Winnie-the-Pooh stories and characters titled Christopher Robin, directed by Marc Forster and written by Alex Ross Perry, Tom McCarthy and Allison Schroeder. The film centers on an adult Christopher Robin, who returns to the Hundred Acre Wood to spend time with Pooh and the gang. Ewan McGregor stars as the title character and Hayley Atwell as Robin's wife Evelyn. Jim Cummings reprises his voice roles of Winnie the Pooh and Tigger, Brad Garrett and Nick Mohammed respectively voice Eeyore and Piglet, and Sophie Okonedo, Peter Capaldi and Toby Jones respectively voice Kanga, Rabbit and Owl. The film was released on August 3, 2018.

Direct-to-video films

Pooh's Grand Adventure: The Search for Christopher Robin (1997)
Pooh's Grand Adventure: The Search for Christopher Robin (also known as Winnie the Pooh's Most Grand Adventure in some countries) is a 1997 American direct-to-video animated adventure comedy-drama film directed by Karl Geurs. The film follows Pooh and his friends on a journey to find and rescue their friend Christopher Robin from the "Skull". This was the first feature-length Winnie the Pooh film which did not contain any previously released material but was instead all new material.

It's time for Christopher Robin to go to school, which means he's unable to keep regularly visiting with Winnie the Pooh. But when the gang misreads a letter from Christopher, they think their friend has been snatched and taken to a faraway land by the mysterious "Skullasaurus". Along with Tigger, Piglet, Eeyore and Rabbit, Pooh journeys to the terrifying place to rescue their friend, meeting many frightening obstacles along the way as the group deals with their own insecurities in a coming of age story for all of them.

Seasons of Giving (1999)
Seasons of Giving is a 1999 direct-to-video animated musical film. The film is a compilation of material that already existed, combining the short film A Winnie the Pooh Thanksgiving, with two episodes from The New Adventures of Winnie the Pooh (Groundpiglet Day and Find Her, Keep Her). It features new songs by The Sherman Brothers, made specifically for this release.

A collection of several holiday stories; as Pooh Bear, Piglet, and Tigger set out to find the right ingredients for Winter, Piglet is forced to becoming the local Groundhog; Rabbit learns how to manage a complicated Thanksgiving dinner; and everyone gets a special visit from an old friend.

The Book of Pooh: Stories from the Heart (2001)
The Book of Pooh: Stories from the Heart is a 2001 direct-to-video film released on DVD and VHS on July 17, 2001. It is a compilation film composed of footage from the Disney Channel/Playhouse Disney television series The Book of Pooh. It contains six episodes; each focusing on one character; wrapped together by a loose plot in which the characters are in Christopher Robin's room waiting for his arrival. As is typical with the series, each episode features an original musical number. The film's running time is 1 hour, 16 minutes and 19 seconds.

A Very Merry Pooh Year (2002)
A Very Merry Pooh Year is a 2002 American direct-to-video Christmas animated film which featured the 1991 Christmas TV special Winnie the Pooh and Christmas Too, as well as the new film, Happy Pooh Year. It serves as the series finale of The New Adventures of Winnie the Pooh.

After celebrating Christmas in the Hundred Acre Wood, the countdown to the New Year begins while Rabbit succumbs to a case of the winter blues. Seeing the change in their newly grumpy friend, the residents of the Hundred Acre Wood decide on some New Year's resolutions that result in drastic changes.

Springtime with Roo (2004)
Springtime with Roo is a 2004 American direct-to-video animated musical adventure comedy-drama film, featuring the characters from Disney's Winnie-the-Pooh franchise. It is a very loose adaptation of Charles Dickens' classic story A Christmas Carol, although Christmas has been replaced by Easter. The film consist of all new material, unlike several other Pooh productions.

Roo gets excited about Easter, however, Rabbit instead declares the day "Spring Cleaning Day", hurt over when Tigger usurped him as leader of Easter the previous year.

Pooh's Heffalump Halloween Movie (2005)
Pooh's Heffalump Halloween Movie is a 2005 American direct-to-video animated mystery adventure film, featuring the characters from the Winnie the Pooh franchise. This was the last time that John Fiedler provided Piglet's voice, as he died three months before the film was released. This release incorporates the short film Boo to You Too! Winnie the Pooh into the storyline.

On their first Halloween together, Roo and Lumpy gather the courage to search for the Gobloon, a creature that can grant wishes.

Super Sleuth Christmas Movie (2007)
Super Sleuth Christmas Movie is a 2007 film based on the hit Playhouse Disney series My Friends Tigger & Pooh. It was released direct-to-video. It premiered on Playhouse Disney on December 6, 2008. Darby, Pooh Bear, and their friends work together to rescue Santa's lost reindeer-trainee, Holly.

Tigger & Pooh and a Musical Too (2009)
Tigger & Pooh and a Musical Too is a 2009 direct-to-video film based on the hit Playhouse Disney series My Friends Tigger & Pooh. It is the second film of the series. It was released on DVD on April 7, 2009. It premiered on Playhouse Disney less than a week later on April 11. Unlike the Super Sleuth Christmas Movie, it is treated more like a regular film than as part of the series.

Rabbit creates many new rules as the Mayor of the Hundred Acre Wood, leading Tigger to challenge him for mayorship and causing a Big White Line to be drawn, dividing the place.

Super Duper Super Sleuths (2010)
Super Duper Super Sleuths is the third Winnie the Pooh film based on the series My Friends Tigger and Pooh. This is the fifth Winnie the Pooh film to feature Lumpy the Heffalump.

Short films, specials, and featurettes

Winnie the Pooh and the Honey Tree
Winnie the Pooh and the Honey Tree is a 1966 animated featurette. It was released theatrically by Buena Vista Distribution Company on February 4, 1966 with The Ugly Dachshund. Based on the first two chapters of the book Winnie-the-Pooh by A. A. Milne, it is the only Winnie the Pooh production released under Walt Disney's supervision before his death in December 1966. It was later added as a segment to the March 1977 film The Many Adventures of Winnie the Pooh. Music and lyrics were written by the Sherman Brothers (Richard M. Sherman and Robert B. Sherman). Background music was provided by Buddy Baker.

Hungry for honey, Winnie-the-Pooh attempts to raid a beehive in a tall tree. After failing, he goes to Rabbit's house and eats all of his honey, making him too chubby to leave when he's stuck in Rabbit's entryway.

Winnie the Pooh and the Blustery Day
Winnie the Pooh and the Blustery Day is a 1968 animated featurette based on the third, fifth, ninth and tenth chapters of the Winnie-the-Pooh book and the second, eighth and ninth chapters from The House at Pooh Corner by A. A. Milne. The featurette was produced by Walt Disney Productions and released theatrically by Buena Vista Distribution Company on December 20, 1968 with The Horse in the Gray Flannel Suit. This was the second of the studio's Winnie the Pooh shorts. It was later added as a segment to the March 1977 film The Many Adventures of Winnie the Pooh. The music was written by Richard M. Sherman and Robert B. Sherman. It was notable for being the last animated short produced by Walt Disney, who died during its production. He posthumously won the Academy Award for Best Animated Short Film.

Winnie-the-Pooh and his friends experience high winds, heavy rains, and a flood in Hundred Acre Wood.

Winnie the Pooh and Tigger Too
Winnie the Pooh and Tigger Too is a 1974 animated featurette released theatrically by Buena Vista Distribution Company on December 20, 1974 with The Island at the Top of the World. It was nominated for an Academy Award for Best Animated Short Film, but lost to Closed Mondays. It was later added as a segment to the 1977 film The Many Adventures of Winnie the Pooh. A soundtrack album was released simultaneously and featured such songs as "The Honey Tree" and "Birthday, Birthday". The film, whose name is a play on the slogan "Tippecanoe and Tyler too" made famous during the 1840 United States presidential election, is based on the fourth and seventh chapters of The House at Pooh Corner, and as well as the third chapter of the book Winnie-the-Pooh.

Rabbit is tired of Tigger always bouncing him, so he gets Pooh and Piglet together to come up with an idea to get the bounce out of Tigger. Then, Tigger and little Roo go out for a bounce and get caught in a tree.

Winnie the Pooh Discovers the Seasons
Winnie the Pooh Discovers the Seasons is a short film made by Walt Disney Productions' educational media division, released on September 6, 1981.

Winnie the Pooh and a Day for Eeyore
Winnie the Pooh and a Day for Eeyore is a 1983 animated featurette theatrically released by Buena Vista Distribution Company on March 11, 1983 with a reissue of The Sword in the Stone (1963). Based on the sixth chapter of Winnie-the-Pooh and the sixth chapter from The House at Pooh Corner. It is the fourth and final of Disney's original theatrical featurettes adapted from the Pooh books by A. A. Milne. Produced by Rick Reinert Productions, this was the first Disney animated film since the 1938 Silly Symphonies short Merbabies to be produced by an outside studio.

Eeyore thinks everyone in the Hundred Acre Wood has forgotten his birthday. When Winnie the Pooh and his friends realize their oversight, they prepare a huge celebration with chocolate cake and a birthday game.

Cartoon All-Stars to the Rescue
Cartoon All-Stars to the Rescue is an American animated drug prevention television special starring many of the popular cartoon characters from American weekday, Sunday morning, and Saturday morning television at the time of this film's release. The plot chronicles the exploits of Michael, a teenager who is using marijuana and stealing his father's beer.

Winnie the Pooh and Christmas Too
Winnie the Pooh and Christmas Too is a Christmas television special based on the television series The New Adventures of Winnie the Pooh, originally broadcast on Saturday, December 14, 1991 on ABC.

Boo to You Too! Winnie the Pooh
Boo to You Too! Winnie the Pooh is a Halloween television special based on the Saturday morning television series The New Adventures of Winnie the Pooh, originally broadcast on October 25, 1996.

A Winnie the Pooh Thanksgiving
A Winnie the Pooh Thanksgiving is a 1998 made-for-TV special featuring the voice talents of Jim Cummings, Paul Winchell, and John Fiedler. The special shows Pooh and his friends learning the true meaning of Thanksgiving.

A Valentine for You
A Valentine for You is a Valentine's Day special based on the television series The New Adventures of Winnie the Pooh as well as A. A. Milne's treasured stories, originally broadcast on February 13, 1999. This is the final role of Paul Winchell as Tigger before his retirement in 2000 and his death in 2005. It was released on DVD in 2004 and 2010. It features the same cast, musical themes, and some of the same themes as Pooh's Grand Adventure: The Search for Christopher Robin, making it an indirect follow-up.

When Christopher Robin seems to be interested in a girl, Winnie the Pooh, Piglet and their friends fear that their friend will abandon them. Convinced that a second bite from the love bug will cure him of his lovesickness, the group sets out to explore the Hundred Acre Wood in search of the mysterious "Smitten".

TV series

Welcome to Pooh Corner
Welcome to Pooh Corner is a live-action/puppet television series that aired on The Disney Channel, featuring the characters from the Winnie the Pooh universe portrayed by actors in human-sized puppet suits, except Roo, who was originally a traditional puppet. The animatronic costumes used for the characters were created by Alchemy II, Inc., headed by Ken Forsse who later created the toy sensation Teddy Ruxpin. The show was first aired on April 18, 1983, the day The Disney Channel was launched.

The New Adventures of Winnie the Pooh
The New Adventures of Winnie the Pooh is an American Saturday morning children's animated television series produced by Walt Disney Television that ran from January 17, 1988 to October 26, 1991, inspired by A. A. Milne's Winnie-the-Pooh stories. It has been released on VHS and DVD.

Winnie the Pooh stars in this animated series adapted from A. A. Milne's classic children's books that depict the misadventures of Pooh and his friends. Each episode highlights the importance of cooperation and friendship as they solve the problems that come their way and embark on many epic adventures.

The Book of Pooh
The Book of Pooh is an American children's puppetry television series that aired on the Disney Channel. It is the third television series to feature the characters from the Disney franchise based on A. A. Milne's work. It premiered on January 22, 2001, and completed its run on July 8, 2003. The show is produced by Shadow Projects, and Playhouse Disney. The characters are portrayed through puppetry. Most notable is the promotion of Kessie to the main cast, after her guest role on New Adventures.

My Friends Tigger & Pooh
My Friends Tigger & Pooh is an American computer-animated television series based on the A. A. Milne children's books. The television series features Winnie-the-Pooh and his friends, including two new characters: a brave 6-year-old red-headed girl named Darby and her dog Buster. Although Darby appears to be the main human friend of Pooh and the gang and the leader of the Super Sleuths, Christopher Robin still appears sporadically.

Playdate With Winnie The Pooh 
On April 2022 as part of the "Disney Junior Fun-Fest Showcase" presentation by Disney Branded Television at Disney's California Adventure, Disney Branded Television CEO Ayo Davis announced a brand new short-form musical animated series from Disney Television Animation under the title "Playdate With Winnie The Pooh" under the premise of "a new musical short-form series starring Winnie the Pooh and his friends in the Hundred Acre Wood", as of 2023 there hasn't been information on the creative members of the project.

Other appearances
In the animated series House of Mouse, the characters from The Many Adventures of Winnie the Pooh make several cameo appearances throughout the series.
In the animated series Doc McStuffins, Pooh, Christopher Robin, Tigger, Piglet and Eeyore make a guest appearance in the episode "Into the Hundred Acre Wood".

Video games

Winnie the Pooh in the Hundred Acre Wood
Winnie the Pooh in the Hundred Acre Wood was a single player adventure game created by Al Lowe for Sierra On-Line.

Tigger's Honey Hunt
Tigger's Honey Hunt is a video game that was released in 2000 for the Nintendo 64, PlayStation, Microsoft Windows. The game was developed by DokiDenki Studio a third-party developer, for Disney Interactive whom published the PC version and co-released the game on home consoles through NewKidCo in North America, while the European release was published by Ubisoft. The game has a spiritual successor called "Pooh and Tigger's Hunny Safari" with much of the same story but with different mini games.

Winnie the Pooh wants to have a party but he's running low on honey. Tigger agrees to help by heading off into the forest to look for more. This adventure takes Tigger through nine different levels of friendly platform action, full of challenges like slippery ice, falling boulders, and creepy caves.

Winnie the Pooh: Adventures in the 100 Acre Wood
Winnie the Pooh: Adventures in the 100 Acre Wood is a video game that was released in 2000 for the Game Boy Color. The game was developed by NewKidCo and published by NewKidCo and Disney.

Pooh's Party Games: In Search of the Treasure
Pooh's Party Game: In Search of the Treasure (Party Time with Winnie the Pooh in Europe) is a video game released on the PlayStation, Sega Dreamcast and Nintendo 64 in 2001, inspired by the Mario Party series.

Piglet's Big Game
Piglet's Big Game is a 2003 action-adventure video game by Gotham Games, Disney Interactive Studios and Doki Denki Studio. The game centers around Piglet and how he tries to show how he can help. The game is based on Piglet's Big Movie.

Winnie the Pooh's Rumbly Tumbly Adventure
Winnie the Pooh's Rumbly Tumbly Adventure is an action-adventure video game of the action-adventure genre released in 2005. It was published by Ubisoft and Disney Interactive and developed by Phoenix Studio.

Ready to Read with Pooh
Ready to Read with Pooh is a Disney Interactive CD-ROM game that helps youngsters ages three to six learn to read. There are nine activities in the game. When youngsters complete an activity successfully, they will receive an item for the new treehouse that the player has "moved into".

Ready for Math with Pooh
Ready for Math with Pooh is a Disney Interactive CD-ROM game that helps youngsters ages three to six learn basic mathematical concepts. There are nine activities in the game. When an activity is completed, the player receives an item for a garden that the gang is using to cheer up Eeyore.

Disney Learning: Winnie the Pooh 
Disney Learning: Winnie the Pooh consists of three sister games: Winnie The Pooh Toddler (1999), Winnie the Pooh Preschool (October 1999), Winnie The Pooh Kindergarten (2000).

Pooh's Hunny Trouble
Pooh's Hunny Trouble is a puzzle mobile game developed by Disney Mobile Studios.

Winnie The Pooh's Home Run Derby
Winnie The Pooh's Home Run Derby is a 2010 Japanese Flash baseball video game published at the Walt Disney Pictures website. The player controls Pooh in order to defeat his eight friends in a baseball match. The game won cult following in early 2013 and became a viral hit due to its extreme difficulty.

Other appearances
 In the Kingdom Hearts series (2002–present) Winnie the Pooh is one of several Disney franchises to be represented as a world in the RPG franchise developed by Square Enix. "The 100 Acre Wood" has appeared in Kingdom Hearts, Kingdom Hearts: Chain of Memories (and its remake), Kingdom Hearts II, Kingdom Hearts Birth by Sleep, and Kingdom Hearts III, and the characters also make a minor appearance in the mobile and browser game Kingdom Hearts χ.
 Winnie the Pooh is one of the central characters in the video game Disney Friends, released in 2007 by Amaze Entertainment for the Nintendo DS, where the player can interact with him.
 In the world builder game Disney Magic Kingdoms, a limited time Event focused on Winnie the Pooh introduced some playable characters from the franchise, as well as some attractions based on locations of the film or real attractions from Disney Parks, with other characters being included in later updates of the game. In the game the characters are involved in new storylines.

Other

Return to Pooh Corner
Return to Pooh Corner is a children's music album by soft rock singer Kenny Loggins. Released in 1994, it features songs written by John Lennon, Rickie Lee Jones, Paul Simon and Jimmy Webb, along with several other traditional children's songs. It was a successful album for Loggins, selling over 500,000 copies, and was nominated for a Grammy. Loggins returned to Pooh Corner several years later with 2000's More Songs from Pooh Corner.

The Many Adventures of Winnie the Pooh and Pooh's Hunny Hunt
The Many Adventures of Winnie the Pooh is a dark ride based upon the 1977 film The Many Adventures of Winnie the Pooh. The attraction exists in slightly different forms at the Magic Kingdom in the Walt Disney World Resort, Disneyland, Hong Kong Disneyland, and Shanghai Disneyland. Pooh's Hunny Hunt, located in Tokyo Disneyland, is an entirely different "E-ticket class" attraction, featuring full audio-animatronics and an innovative 'trackless' ride system.

More Songs from Pooh Corner
More Songs from Pooh Corner is a children's music album released in 2000 by Kenny Loggins. The follow-up to his 1994 album Return to Pooh Corner, it includes the theme song from the 2000 Disney animated film The Tigger Movie, "Your Heart Will Lead You Home", which he also performed for that film's soundtrack, as well as several classic film songs and duets with Olivia Newton-John and Alison Krauss.

Magazine
Winnie the Pooh Magazine sold 1.35 million copies in Disney's fiscal year 2008 via 35 editions.

Return to the Hundred Acre Wood
Return to the Hundred Acre Wood is a Winnie-the-Pooh novel published on 5 October 2009. Written by David Benedictus and illustrated by Mark Burgess, it was the first such book since 1928 and introduced the character Lottie the Otter.

In the mid-1990s, after completing an audio adaptation of Milne's Winnie-the-Pooh stories, Benedictus wrote two Pooh short stories of his own and submitted them to the trustees of the Milne estate.  The trustees replied that they were unable to publish the stories because "Walt Disney owned all the rights."  However, ten years later, Benedictus was contacted by the trustees, who explained that "the sequel rights had reverted to them" and asked Benedictus to make changes to one of the short stories and to submit some more.  This collection of stories was published as Return to the Hundred Acre Wood.

Musical adaptation

In May 2021, Disney Theatrical Productions announced that the Winnie the Pooh franchise would be adapted for a run on Broadway at the Theatre Row Building, starting October 21 of that year.

References

Bibliography
 

 
Film series introduced in 1966
Walt Disney Studios (division) franchises
Animated film series
Musical film series
Comedy film franchises
Fantasy film franchises
Children's film series